Pidgin Madam is a term describing a language that is a mixture of Lebanese Arabic and traditional Sinhalese.  Since the oil boom of the 1970s, several forms of Pidgin Arabic, such as Gulf Pidgin Arabic, evolved to become a popular form of communication due to foreign workers coming from South and South Eastern Asian countries.  These workers tend to live and work in urban cities.

History 
Pidgin Madam is largely spoken by Sinhalese/Sri Lankan women working in the Levant area of the Middle East, and involved the communication mostly between Lebanese Madames, and Sinhalese servants, hence the name Pidgin Madam.  Pidgin Madam was constructed through pidginization, and locally recognized in the areas where the language is spoken.  There are an estimated 730,000 Sri Lankan Domestic workers abroad, 350,000 of which are working in the Middle East and spread between the following countries; 160,000 in the UAE, 80,000 in Lebanon, 40,000 in Kuwait, 40,000 in Oman, 30,000 in Qatar, and 30,000 in Jordan.  The Pidgin tends to be spoken by all Sinahalese workers in this region, apart from areas where an English Pidgin is more popular.  Although we know an estimate of the number of Sinahalese workers in the Middle East, the number of fluent speakers of the Pidgin is unrecorded, and would need to be investigated through studying Arabic families (with Sinhalese servants) in the regions.

Sociological context 
Sri Lankan woman started to arrive specifically in Lebanon in the late 1970s, and represent three quarters of immigrant female domestic workers in Lebanon.  The workers would be placed with large upper-class Lebanese families (typically with many young children) through recruitment agencies, and would be contracted under 3 year agreements.  These domestic workers tend to live with the family and may participate in special occasions such as holiday's abroad, or religious celebrations. Workers are usually confined with the family within the 3 years, and may renew their contract with the same family if a close relationship is established between the family, children, and foreign worker.  The worker may take on tasks to help the family such as laundry, preparing food, and other day-to-day chores.

Linguistic context 
Lebanese and Sinhalese are very different languages which have been combined to form this Pidgin. Lebanese is a Semitic language belonging to the Eastern Dialects of Arabic, with a long historical contact to Syriac.  There is French influence over the language to the colonial history of France in the Levant.  Lebanese Arabic is a language belonging to the Levant dialects of Arabic.  Sinahala is within Indo-Aryan context, with a dravidophone environment, as well as contact with Hela/Elu, an instinct indigenous language.

Language acquisition 
The Family host "Madam" takes charge of educating the newly arrived domestic worker by introducing her to basic, simple sentences, emphasizing communication through eye contact, and touch.  The worker may take different lengths of time to become accustomed to the new environment, but after a typical 6-7 months, the pidgin tends to evolve in a personalized way to form a communication method between the hosts and the worker.  As time evolves and the worker becomes more comfortable and familiarized with the new environment and means of communication, reliance on physical gesturing to assist communication diminishes. 

There is a third person feminine singular, which is the most common designation.  The "Madam" tends to be the only one who truly masters the Pidgin, and translates between Sri Lankan as communication becomes deeper.  There are two primary dilemmas that are involved in adopting a pidgin between the servant and the master. The first involves the need of privacy, where a family may use complex forms of communication to purposely exclude the servant from communication.  The second involves a need for an upgraded effort to adopt the language further when necessary. 

In the Pidgin, there are "imperative forms that are used as a verbal base, forms of the modal incompleteness which, in fact, are the forms that are hard inside the prohibitive, minus the article".

References 

(1) Bizri, Fida. “The Pidgin Madam, a New Arab Pidgin”, Linguistics , vol. 41, no. 2, 2005, pp. 53–67.

(2) Lengua y migración = Language and migration. 2014, 6(2), páginas 7-40. ISSN 1889-5425

(3) Fida Bizri. Sinhala in Contact with Arabic: The Birth of a New Pidgin in the Middle East. ARSALL, 2009, pp.135-148. ffhal-00675380f

Wikipedia Student Program
Arabic-based pidgins and creoles
Sinhala language